The Jesus Storybook Bible is a children's Bible written by New York Times bestselling author Sally Lloyd-Jones and illustrated by Jago from Cornwall. The first edition was published in 2007 by Zonderkidz, the children's arm of American Christian media and publishing company Zondervan.

It has sold two million copies  in 19 languages. In 2015 it was included in the Evangelical Christian Publishers Association (ECPA) Top 100 Best-sellers list.

The book is written for children of age four and upwards and includes 44 Bible stories.

Zondervan commissioned the chapter ‘The Servant King’ as an animation which was produced by Quirky Motion and directed by John Lumgair.

Awards
 Gold Moonbeam Children's Book Award 2007

See also
 The Big Picture Story Bible

References

External links

Official website

Bibles for children
Zondervan books
2007 non-fiction books